For Better, for Worse is a 1959 Hong Kong drama film written and directed by Yueh Feng. The film was selected as the Hong Kong entry for the Best Foreign Language Film at the 32nd Academy Awards, but was not accepted as a nominee.

Cast
 Helen Li Mei as Meijuan
 Yang Chang as Gao Yongsheng
 Feng Su as Xiujuan
 Connie Chan as Damei
 Xiaoyu Deng as Xiaohu (as Peter Dunn)
 Xiang Gao as Landlord's Wife
 Yunzhong Li as Yongsheng's Brother-in-law
 Enjia Liu as Mr. Zhao - The Landlord
 Qianmeng Liu as Yongsheng's Sister
 Ching Tien as Li Zixin

See also
 List of submissions to the 32nd Academy Awards for Best Foreign Language Film
 List of Hong Kong submissions for the Academy Award for Best Foreign Language Film

References

External links
 
 HK Cinemagic entry

1959 films
1950s Mandarin-language films
1959 drama films
Hong Kong black-and-white films
Films directed by Yueh Feng